The 1990–91 Washington Capitals season was the Washington Capitals 17th season in the National Hockey League (NHL).

Offseason
The Capitals acquired Peter Zezel from St. Louis for Geoff Courtnall as their main move during the offseason.

Regular season

The Capitals had the best penalty-killing unit during the regular season, allowing the fewest power-play goals (44) and finishing with the NHL's best penalty-killing percentage (85.99%).

Final standings

Schedule and results

Playoffs

Round 1: (P2) New York Rangers vs. (P3) Washington Capitals

Round 2: (P1) Pittsburgh Penguins vs. (P3) Washington Capitals

Player statistics

Regular season
Scoring

Goaltending

Playoffs
Scoring

Goaltending

Note: GP = Games played; G = Goals; A = Assists; Pts = Points; +/- = Plus/minus; PIM = Penalty minutes; PPG=Power-play goals; SHG=Short-handed goals; GWG=Game-winning goals
      MIN=Minutes played; W = Wins; L = Losses; T = Ties; GA = Goals against; GAA = Goals against average; SO = Shutouts; SA=Shots against; SV=Shots saved; SV% = Save percentage;

Awards and records

Transactions

Draft picks
Washington's draft picks at the 1990 NHL Entry Draft held at the BC Place in Vancouver, British Columbia.

Farm teams

See also
 1990–91 NHL season

References

External links
 

1990–91 NHL season by team
1990–91 in American ice hockey by team
1990–91
Washington Capitals
Washington Capitals